iTunes may refer to:

 iTunes, a media player by Apple
 iTunes Connect, an Apple service for developers
 iTunes Match, an iCloud-based music hosting service by Apple
 iTunes Radio, an online radio service by Apple
 iTunes Remote, a software remote for the Apple TV Second generation or later
 iTunes Store, an online media store by Apple
 iTunes App Store

Disambiguation pages